Marine De Nadaï (born 2 June 1988) is a French rugby union player. She represented  at the 2014 Women's Rugby World Cup. She was a member of the squad that won their fourth Six Nations title in 2014.

References

1988 births
Living people
French female rugby union players